Lohrmann is a small lunar impact crater that is located to the west of the Oceanus Procellarum, near the western limb of the Moon. It lies to the north of the dark-floored walled plain Grimaldi, and just to the south of the crater Hevelius.

This crater is nearly circular, although it does not appear so from the Earth due to foreshortening. It has a narrow inner wall at the north end and a somewhat eroded edge. The interior floor has some low hills and a small craterlet in the western half. The remainder of the floor is relatively featureless except for some tiny craters.

Satellite craters
By convention these features are identified on lunar maps by placing the letter on the side of the crater midpoint that is closest to Lohrmann.

References

 
 
 
 
 
 
 
 
 
 
 
 

Geology of the Moon
Impact craters on the Moon
Lunar science